Winter Carols is the sixth studio album by the group Blackmore's Night, released in the United Kingdom on October, 2006, and in the United States on November 7, 2006. It is a Christmas themed album. The cover artwork for this album, painted by Karsten Topelmann, is an adaptation of a street in Rothenburg ob der Tauber, Germany, in line with the band's heavy Renaissance influence. The same street is portrayed in the cover of Blackmore's Night's second studio album, Under a Violet Moon. In the cover of "Winter Carols" the street is painted as winter time, whereas Under a Violet Moon'''s cover takes place on apparently a summer night.  While the selections "Winter (Basse Dance)" is credited to Ritchie Blackmore as composer, it is an adaptation of the second section of Joaquin Rodrigo's "Fantasía para un gentilhombre," which Rodrigo composed for classical guitar virtuoso Andres Segovia in 1954.

In December 2006, Winter Carols'' entered at #7 on USA Billboard New Age Charts.

The album won the New Age Reporter Lifestyle Music Award as the Best Holiday Album.

Track listing

2013 Reissue 
The album was re-issued in 2013 with an additional CD of live versions, along with that year's single – a reworking of the track Christmas Eve.

2017 Reissue

Disc 1

Disc 2

2021 Edition

Disc 1

Disc 2

Personnel 
Ritchie Blackmore – arrangements, guitar, mandola, nyckelharpa, hurdy-gurdy, percussion
Candice Night – vocals, shawm, pennywhistle
Pat Regan – production, arrangements, keyboards
 Sir Robert of Normandie (Robert Curiano) – bass
 Sisters of the Moon: Lady Madeline and Lady Nancy (Madeline and Nancy Posner) – harmony vocals
 Bard David of Larchmont (David Baranowski) – keyboards
 Sarah Steiding – violin
 Anton Fig – drums
 Albert Dannemann – bagpipes, backing vocals
 Ian Robertson and Jim Manngard – backing vocals

Charts

References

External links 
 Interview with Candice Night at BellaOnline
 Interview with Blackmore's Night at Gothronic

Blackmore's Night albums
2006 Christmas albums
Christmas albums by American artists
Christmas albums by English artists
Folk rock Christmas albums
AFM Records albums